Anectropis fumigata is a moth of the family Geometridae first described by Sato in 1991. It is found in Taiwan.

References

Moths described in 1991
Ennominae
Moths of Taiwan